Wenchang Subdistrict may refer to the following subdistricts in China:

Wencheng Subdistrict, Fuzhou, a subdistrict of Linchuan District, Fuzhou, Jiangxi
Wencheng Subdistrict, Jinan, a subdistrict of Changqing District, Jinan, Shangdong
Wenchang Subdistrict, Tianjin, a subdistrict of Jizhou District, Tianjin
Wencheng Subdistrict, Tongcheng, a subdistrict of Tongcheng, Anqing, Anhui
Wencheng Subdistrict, Zhoukou, a subdistrict of Chuanhui District, Zhoukou, Henan
Wenchang, Dongkou, a subdistrict of Dongkou County, Hunan

See also
Wenchang (disambiguation)
Wencheng (disambiguation)